Marinifilum is a genus of bacteria from the family of Marinifilaceae.

References

Bacteroidia
Bacteria genera